Monachoides is a genus of air-breathing land snails, terrestrial pulmonate gastropod mollusks in the family Hygromiidae, the hairy snails and their allies. 

Some species of snails in this genus create and use love darts as part of their mating behavior.

Species
The following species are recognised within the genus Monachoides:
 Monachoides bacescui (Grossu, 1979)
 †Monachoides barotiana Marinescu, 1975
 Monachoides fallax (Wagner, 1914)
 Monachoides incarnatus (Müller, 1774) - the type species, sometimes the adjectival species name is treated as if the genus name had a feminine gender: Monarchoides incarnata
 Monachoides kosovoensis (De Winter & Maassen, 1992)
 Monachoides taraensis (De Winter & Maassen, 1992)
 Monachoides vicinus (Rossmässler, 1842)

References

 Bank, R. A. (2017). Classification of the Recent terrestrial Gastropoda of the World. Last update: July 16th, 2017

External links
Monachoides. Uniprot Taxonomy.

Gastropod genera
Hygromiidae